The Denizli is a breed of rooster developed in Denizli, Turkey. It is characterised by its long-crowing abilities, with the general guideline being a crow of 20–25 seconds in their first year. The breed is divided into 3 groups based on colour, body structure, and comb types. 
It is described as having black eyes, dark gray or purple leg colour, with silver or red hackles and sometimes red feathering on the wings. They weigh 3–3.5 kg.

It has been the symbol of both Denizli City and Province for at least nine hundred years, after excavations at Laodicea on the Lycus revealed a 900-year-old relief of the cities symbol. In 2013 the largest glass sculpture in Turkey, a giant Denizli rooster in Delikliçınar Square, Denizli City, was unveiled to celebrate this find following a survey to decide on a statue for the newly renovated square.

Its population has been noted as declining, and an active conservation program is now in progress by the Lalahan Central Livestock Research Institute.

A video of a Denizli rooster crowing entitled "death metal rooster", went viral on YouTube in 2010. Discovery Channel covered the video explaining how roosters crow for such a long duration. The video was nominated in the O Music Awards 2011 for Best Animal Performance.

References

Denizli
Chicken breeds
Chicken breeds originating in Turkey
Internet memes